A Very Honorable Guy is a 1934 American pre-Code comedy film directed by Lloyd Bacon, written by Earl Baldwin, and starring Joe E. Brown, Alice White, Robert Barrat, Alan Dinehart, Irene Franklin and Hobart Cavanaugh. It was released by Warner Bros. on May 5, 1934.

Premise
Well respected local good guy, Feet Samuels finds himself heavily in debt due to an uncharacteristic gambling binge. Feet decides the only way to settle the bill is by selling his body to an ambitious doctor. The doctor agrees to allow him one last month to live life to the fullest, then commit suicide.

Cast     
 Joe E. Brown as 'Feet' Samuels
 Alice White as Hortense
 Robert Barrat as Dr. Snitzer
 Alan Dinehart as The Brain
 Irene Franklin as Toodles
 Hobart Cavanaugh as Benny
 Arthur Vinton as Moon O'Hara
 G. Pat Collins as Red Hendrickson 
 Harold Huber as Joe Ponzetti
 James Donlan as Mr. O'Toole
 Harry Warren as Harry
 Bud Jamison as Waiter (uncredited)

References

External links
 
 
 
 

1934 films
1930s English-language films
Warner Bros. films
American comedy films
1934 comedy films
Films directed by Lloyd Bacon
American black-and-white films
1930s American films
Films scored by Bernhard Kaun
American films about gambling
Films about suicide